The S&P/ASX200 VIX (A-VIX) is a financial market product that participants trade based on the market price of the implied volatility in the underlying Australian equity index.

Uses and interpretation
The A-VIX is a market instrument pricing investor sentiment and market expectations. A relatively high A-VIX value implies that the market expects significant changes in the S&P/ASX 200 over the next 30 days, while a relatively low A-VIX value implies that the market expects minimal change. The ASX chart below illustrates this relationship.

Similarly, when the A-VIX is at relatively high levels, investor sentiment prices in high uncertainty.

Conversely, when the A-VIX is at relatively low levels, it implies low uncertainty.

Instruments such as the A-VIX are often perceived to show characteristics of mean reversion by oscillating around a long-term average (or mean). In other words, a move away from the long-term average towards high or low extremes is usually followed by a move back towards the long-term average.

The implication is that high levels of volatility may be followed by a return to more normal volatility levels, and low levels of volatility may be precursors to an increase in volatility.

The A-VIX is reported as an annualized standard deviation percentage that can be converted to a shorter time period. For instance, an A-VIX value of 20% can be converted to a monthly figure, remembering that volatility scales at the square root of time, the formula is:

20% x  = 5.77%

In the above example, index options over the S&P/ASX 200 are incorporating the potential for a one standard deviation return over the next month of +/- 5.77%.

Trading volatility
The S&P/ASX 200 VIX Futures (A-VIX futures) is an exchange-traded tool available on ASX designed specifically to manage and trade anticipated changes in Australian equity market volatility in a single transaction. Refer to ASX for an ASX VIX Futures fax sheet.

With S&P/ASX 200 VIX Futures you can more easily hedge, trade and arbitrage anticipated volatility in the Australian equity market. Other uses include:
 Exploiting the negative correlation between the S&P/ASX 200 VIX and S&P/ASX 200 to hedge equity portfolios
 Diversifying multi-asset portfolios through the addition of volatility as an asset class with a low or negative correlation to other asset classes 
 Hedging of Vega risk present in option portfolios 
 Hedging of over-the-counter (OTC) volatility products
 Development of arbitrage strategies using S&P/ASX 200 VIX Futures and related securities such as index options
 Profiting from correctly anticipating changes in the implied volatility of the Australian equity market 
 Trading the spread between different contract months in S&P/ASX 200 VIX Futures 
 Trading between the S&P/ASX 200 VIX Futures and VIX futures on other markets.

How does it benefit investors?
 Diversification and portfolio insurance
The strong negative correlation between the S&P/ASX 200 VIX and the S&P/ASX 200 means the addition of S&P/ASX 200 VIX Futures to a portfolio may deliver diversification benefits in a world where negative correlations are becoming harder to find (witness the rising correlation between international equity markets and the rising equity-bond correlation). Refer to a paper titled "VIX Your Portfolio – Selling Volatility to Improve Performance" written by Thomas McFarren from Black Rock referenced on the Chicago Board Options Exchange (CBOE) site.
 Risk-adjusted returns
In an era where optimising risk adjusted returns is critical, achieving that goal has become increasingly harder. Recent studies in have identified how futures over the US VIX can be used to help achieve this elusive goal.
 New trading opportunities:
S&P/ASX 200 VIX Futures may create opportunities for new trading strategies to exploit a view on the direction of implied volatility. For example, where volatility is expected to increase a trader can implement a long VIX futures position

Comparison with other tools used for managing volatility
 Easier and typically cheaper - S&P/ASX 200 VIX Futures may offer a cheaper and easier to use tool than options when creating and managing an exposure to volatility in the Australian equity market. Being exchange traded and centrally cleared, S&P/ASX 200 VIX Futures also offer operational and risk management advantages beyond over-the-counter products such as variance swaps.
 Pure volatility - Other tools which are used for gaining exposure or hedging against volatility in the Australian equity market also create exposures to additional and unwanted risk. The hedging of these additional risks adds to the cost and complication of managing your exposures.

For example:
 Using a derivative on an offshore-based VIX index may create a higher tracking error (particularly during periods of high volatility), create a currency exposure and require you to trade in the home market time zone to access the best liquidity.
 Use of an option strategy may introduce additional sensitivities such as directional risk, or require adjustments to the strategy and so incur additional transaction costs. 
 OTC products, such as variance swaps, can introduce counterparty risk and their liquidity in the Australian time zone can be patchy.

See also
VIX

References

External links 
S&P/ASX 200 VIX Volatility index
 Join the Linkedin Group – ASX Equity Derivatives 

Australian stock market indices